Bellaspira aurantiaca is a species of sea snail, a marine gastropod mollusc in the family Drilliidae.

Description
The size of an adult shell varies between 4 mm and 12 mm.

Distribution
This species occurs in the Caribbean Sea off the Florida Keys, Louisiana and Alabama.

References

 Fallon P.J. (2016). Taxonomic review of tropical western Atlantic shallow water Drilliidae (Mollusca: Gastropoda: Conoidea) including descriptions of 100 new species. Zootaxa. 4090(1): 1–363

External links
 

aurantiaca
Gastropods described in 2016